Lyndel Wright (born 18 April 1950) is a Jamaican cricketer. He played in 24 first-class and 8 List A matches for the Jamaican cricket team from 1968 to 1979.

See also
 List of Jamaican representative cricketers

References

External links
 

1950 births
Living people
Jamaican cricketers
Jamaica cricketers
Sportspeople from Kingston, Jamaica